Mueang Kalasin is the capital district (amphoe mueang) of Kalasin province, northeastern Thailand.

Geography
Neighboring districts are (from the north clockwise) Sahatsakhan, Somdet, Na Mon, Don Chan, Kamalasai, Khong Chai, Yang Talat, and Nong Kung Si of Kalasin Province.

History
In 1913 the district was renamed from Uthai Kalasin to Mueang Kalasin.

Administration
The district is divided into 17 sub-districts (tambons), which are further subdivided into 180 villages (mubans). The town (thesaban mueang) covers the whole tambon Kalasin. There are three townships (thesaban tambons): Nong So covers tambon Lam Pao and parts of Lamkhlong; Na Chan covers tambon Na Chan and parts of Phai and Phu Po; and Huai Pho covers tambon Huai Pho. There are a further 16 tambon administrative organizations (TAO).

Missing numbers are tambons which now form Don Chan District.

References

External links

Mueang Kalasin